Quercia is a surname of Italian origin, meaning "Oak". Notable people with this name include:

 Boris Quercia (born 1967), Chilean actor, director, writer, and producer
 Jacopo della Quercia (–1438), Italian sculptor
 Julien Quercia (born 1986), French footballer
 Orestes Quércia (1938–2010), Brazilian politician
 Priamo della Quercia (–1467), Italian painter and miniaturist

See also
 Quercus (disambiguation)